Hafiz Mustafa 1864 is a Turkish purveyor of sweets and delicacies which originated and is still headquartered in Istanbul.

It was Founded in 1864 by Hadji İsmail Hakkı Bey during the reign of Sultan Abdulaziz at shop number 86 on the viaduct which today is known as Hamidiye street in the Fatih district of Istanbul.  Hakki Bey began by producing Rock candy.  The Hafiz Mustafa operation won 12 gold medals in confectionery in Europe between 1926 and 1938.

In the present it is run by the Ongular family who have owned it since 2007. Among their offerings are Turkish delights, Baklavas, puddings, teas, and assorted sweets.

Currently the concern has over a dozen branches in Turkey and one at the Mall of Dubai in Dubai. UAE.

References

Turkish confectionery
Turkish cuisine
Companies based in Istanbul
Restaurants in Istanbul
Restaurants established in 1864
1864 establishments in the Ottoman Empire
Fatih